Gregory William Hands (born 14 November 1965) is a British politician who has served as the Member of Parliament (MP) for Chelsea and Fulham, previously Hammersmith and Fulham, since 2005. A member of the Conservative Party, he has served as its Chairman since February 2023. Hands previously served as Minister of State for Trade Policy under four prime ministers,  holding the office on three occasions, and as Minister of State for Business, Energy and Clean Growth from 2021 to 2022.

Hands has been the MP for Chelsea and Fulham since 2010; the constituency was created that year by the splitting of the former constituencies of Kensington and Chelsea and Hammersmith and Fulham. Prior to these boundary changes, he served as the MP for the Hammersmith and Fulham constituency from 2005.

Hands served in Prime Minister David Cameron's Cabinet as Chief Secretary to the Treasury from 2015 until 2016. He voted for the UK to remain in the European Union (EU) during the 2016 Brexit referendum. Following the 2016 referendum vote to leave the EU and Cameron's consequent resignation, Hands was demoted by newly appointed Prime Minister Theresa May to a junior ministerial position at the Department for International Trade. Following the 2017 general election, Hands retained his position as Minister of State for Trade and Investment but also undertook the Minister for London role, replacing Gavin Barwell who lost his seat. Hands resigned in 2018, citing his opposition to the proposed expansion of Heathrow Airport, but returned to the position as Minister of State for Trade Policy in February 2020 under Prime Minister Boris Johnson. 

In September 2021, Hands was appointed Minister of State for Business, Energy and Clean Growth. After Johnson's resignation in 6 September 2022, Hands left that position and briefly returned to the backbenches before being appointed to his former role as Minister of State for Trade Policy by Prime Minister Liz Truss on 9 October 2022. Following the resignation of Truss in October 2022 and the dismissal of Nadhim Zahawi in January 2023, Hands was appointed as the Chairman of the Conservative Party by Prime Minister Rishi Sunak on 7 February 2023.

Early life and career
Hands was born on 14 November 1965 to British parents in New York City. He lived in the United States until he was seven years old and his family moved back to the UK. He was educated at state schools in England; according to his website, "the family was constantly on the move, due to the Labour Government of 1974–1979 closing down grammar schools". Hands completed his secondary education at Dr Challoner's Grammar School, Amersham in 1984.

During his gap year he worked in a swimming pool in Berlin; he became interested in the Eastern Bloc, visiting Prague and other Eastern European cities on future holidays.

He went on to attend Robinson College, Cambridge, where he graduated with a first in Modern History in 1989. He joined the Conservative Party as a student, served as the chairman of the Cambridge University Conservative Association, and was on the Executive Committee of the Cambridge University Students' Union.

Hands spent eight years after university in banking. He worked on trading floors in derivatives at the City of London and New York City until 1997.

Political career
Hands was elected as a councillor in the London Borough of Hammersmith and Fulham in 1998. He became the leader of the Conservative group in 1999, remaining in that capacity until 2003.

In opposition
Hands stood down as councillor for the Town ward in Fulham at the local elections in 2006, having been elected to the House of Commons at the 2005 general election when he gained Hammersmith and Fulham from the Labour Party with a majority of 5,029 votes. The sitting Labour MP Iain Coleman retired due to ill-health, and was replaced as Labour's candidate by Melanie Smallman.

Hands made his maiden speech on 26 May 2005, in which he referred to the fact that the BBC was the largest employer in his constituency and that Hammersmith Broadway was the busiest road interchange in Europe.

Hands was early in his interest in the subject of MPs expenses, causing the whips to attempt to dissuade him.

In 2007, Hands was selected to be the Conservative candidate for the new Chelsea and Fulham parliamentary constituency. His previous seat of Hammersmith and Fulham was abolished for the 2010 general election, with Hammersmith having its own seat (being fought by Shaun Bailey for the Conservatives), and Fulham joining Chelsea in a new seat. In January 2009, Hands was appointed to the Conservative front bench team as a shadow Treasury minister. He is also the Parliamentary chairman of Conservative Friends of Poland.

In government

Cameron–Clegg coalition
Having been elected in 2010 for Chelsea and Fulham, he served as Parliamentary Private Secretary to the chancellor of the exchequer George Osborne, having shadowed the Treasury in opposition.

On 14 October 2011, Hands was appointed as an assistant government whip in the House of Commons as a consequence of the mini-reshuffle following the resignation of Liam Fox as Secretary of State for Defence.

In 2013, Hands voted in favour of legalising same-sex marriage in England and Wales.

Hands was appointed Government Deputy Chief Whip and Treasurer of the Household in October 2013. In March 2014, he was sworn as a Privy Counsellor, entitling him to the style "The Right Honourable" for life.

Majority Cameron government
In May 2015, following the Conservatives' general election win under the stewardship of David Cameron, Hands was promoted by him to the position of Chief Secretary to the Treasury and thus the Cabinet. 

Hands campaigned for the UK to remain in the European Union in the 2016 referendum vote to leave the European Union. In the lead-up to the referendum, Hands led the Chelsea and Fulham Britain Stronger In Europe campaign. During the campaign, Hands issued warnings of the consequences for the UK should it leave the European Union, saying that the country would face "profound consequences" including "fewer jobs, higher prices in our shops and less money for our public services like the NHS". A strong advocate of international trade, he described the European Union's Single Market as being the "most complete commitment to free trade that exists".

May government

In the 2016 reshuffle following the EU referendum and Theresa May's appointment as Prime Minister, he was made Minister of State for Trade Policy at the newly-formed Department for International Trade.

Following the referendum, Hands argued that the UK should leave the European Union with a deal. To justify his changed position regarding the UK outside of the European Union, Hands argued that in "the long term" the UK could "independently conclude better contracts with third countries". Hands voted against the Withdrawal Agreement in the first Meaningful Vote, but voted in favour of it in the second and third meaningful votes, stating that the deal had been improved.

Following the Grenfell Tower fire which killed 71 people, Hands called for the Notting Hill Carnival to be moved. He said, "We have to ask ourselves if it is appropriate to stage a Carnival in the near proximity of a major national disaster." Event organisers and the Labour MP for Kensington rejected his suggestion. The mayor of London, Sadiq Khan, dismissed Hands' proposal.

On 21 June 2018, Hands resigned his ministerial post to vote against a third runway at Heathrow Airport.

Following the third defeat of the Brexit withdrawal agreement in the House of Commons in March 2019, Hands co-chaired the Prosperity UK Alternative Arrangements Commission. This body looked at alternatives to the Irish backstop.

Alongside former neighbouring MPs Justine Greening and Zac Goldsmith, Hands has been critical of the London Borough of Hammersmith and Fulham's April 2019 decision to close Hammersmith Bridge to motor vehicles, and has called for the bridge to be promptly repaired and re-opened.

During the 2019 Conservative Party leadership election, Hands was one of the first MPs to declare their support for Jeremy Hunt. During the campaign, Hands wrote to Boris Johnson requesting that he review the Government's decision to build a third runway at Heathrow Airport. Hunt ultimately lost the contest to Johnson in the final round.

Johnson government
Hands was re-elected as MP for Chelsea and Fulham at the 2019 general election.

Hands was appointed Minister of State for Trade Policy in the second Johnson ministry during the 2020 cabinet reshuffle.

In May 2020, Parliament's Standards and Privileges Committee censured Hands for misusing public funds relating to stationery and pre-paid House of Commons envelopes. In November 2021, Hands followed his party three line whip to vote to overhaul the Standards and Privileges Committee.

Truss government 
Hands was appointed Minister of State for Trade Policy on 9 October 2022.

Sunak government 
Following the firing of Nadhim Zahawi in January 2023, Hands was appointed as his replacement as Chairman of the Conservative Party in a subsequent cabinet reshuffle. As chairman, Hands is responsible for party administration and the organisation of the Conservative Campaign Headquarters.

Personal life
Hands has dual American/British nationality. He lives in Fulham with his German wife Irina, and their son and daughter. Hands says that he speaks five European languages, including German and Czech.

Hands supports Plymouth Argyle and has appeared as a guest at supporters' association events.

During the 2020 COVID-19 pandemic, Hands said that his father, Edward Hands, had died with Coronavirus in a UK care home.

References

External links
Official website

Greg Hands MP Channel YouTube

|-

|-

|-

|-

1965 births
Alumni of Robinson College, Cambridge
American emigrants to England
Conservative Party (UK) MPs for English constituencies
Councillors in the London Borough of Hammersmith and Fulham
Living people
Members of the Privy Council of the United Kingdom
People educated at Dr Challoner's Grammar School
Politicians from New York City
UK MPs 2005–2010
UK MPs 2010–2015
UK MPs 2015–2017
UK MPs 2017–2019
UK MPs 2019–present
Chief Secretaries to the Treasury
Chairmen of the Conservative Party (UK)
Ministers without portfolio